Route 3A is a  state highway in eastern Massachusetts, which parallels Route 3 and U.S. Route 3 from Cedarville in southern Plymouth to Tyngsborough at the New Hampshire state line.

Route 3A has two major posted segments, separated by a lengthy concurrency with Route 3 and US 3.  Its southern portion parallels Route 3 from Cedarville in southern Plymouth to Neponset in the Dorchester area of Boston.  Towns and cities that Route 3A traverse along its path include Plymouth, Kingston, Duxbury, Marshfield, Scituate, Cohasset, Hingham, Weymouth and Quincy.

North of Neponset, Route 3A runs, unsigned, concurrently with Route 3 and U.S. Route 3 to Burlington, before separating again (MassDOT counts the mileage along MA 3 between the two sections as part of MA 3A mileage).

The northern portion of Route 3A parallels U.S. Route 3 in northwestern Middlesex County. It stretches from Interstate 95 (Route 128) in Burlington to the New Hampshire state line, where it continues as Route 3A.

Route description

Plymouth to Boston
This segment parallels Route 3 from Cedarville in southern Plymouth to Neponset in the Dorchester area of Boston.  Towns and cities that Route 3A traverse along its path include Plymouth, Kingston, Duxbury, Marshfield, Scituate, Cohasset, Hingham, Weymouth and Quincy. 

The Claire Saltonstall Bikeway between Boston and Cape Cod twice intersects Route 3A. Once in the Cedarville portion of Plymouth where Route 3A begins, and again about 14 miles later in historic downtown Plymouth between South and Market Streets along Sandwich Street.

Boston to Burlington
This segment is concurrent with Route 3 (to Cambridge) and then U.S. Route 3 (from Cambridge to Burlington).  As an 'A' route concurrent with its parents, this segment is not posted.

Burlington to Tyngsborough

This segment parallels US 3 from Interstate 95 (Route 128) in Burlington to the New Hampshire state line, where it continues as New Hampshire Route 3A. The part south of Route 113 in Tyngsborough is former US 3.

The section from Burlington to Billerica is currently being widened from 2 to 4 lanes.

History

From 1922 to 1926, Route 3A between Kingston and Quincy was New England Interstate Route 6A. In 1926, when New England Interstate Route 6 became Route 3, Route 6A became Route 3A.

In the 1930s Route 3A's route was shifted onto new alignments built to reduce traffic problems in several communities through which the highway traversed. This included a bypass of Hingham Square along Broad Cove Road and Otis Street along Hingham Harbor replacing the original route that took it down Lincoln Street to downtown Hingham then along North Street to Summer Street. Chief Justice Cushing Highway was built around the same time and Route 3A was put on this highway from south of the Hingham Harbor rotary through Cohasset to Scituate. This replaced a routing along long-existing roadways such as Country Way in Scituate, South and North Main Streets in Cohasset and East Street to Summer Street in Hingham. Along East Street from Hull Street to Summer, Route 3A shared the highway with Route 128 in the late 1920s and early 1930s.

In the 1950s and early 1960s Route 3A was extended to take over the original path of Route 3 south of Kingston to Plymouth and north of downtown Quincy to Neponset when Route 3 assumed its current freeway route. In between those locations, old Route 3 was designated Route 53. The section of old Route 3 from Cedarville south to the Sagamore Rotary near the Cape Cod Canal in Bourne is unnumbered.

Much of Route 3A is sometimes referred to as the "Cape Way" due to its history as the only major road to Cape Cod from Boston prior to the opening of Route 3.  The "Cape Way" name is reflected in numerous business names along 3A's length.

The section of Route 3A south of the intersection with Route 113 in Tyngsborough (all but the northern few miles of the route) was formerly U.S. Route 3, prior to the construction of the Northwest Expressway, a freeway connection from I-95 in Burlington to the Everett Turnpike in Nashua, New Hampshire, which was given the U.S. Route 3 designation.

Major intersections

References

003A
Plymouth, Massachusetts
Kingston, Massachusetts
Duxbury, Massachusetts
Marshfield, Massachusetts
Scituate, Massachusetts
Cohasset, Massachusetts
Hingham, Massachusetts
Weymouth, Massachusetts
Quincy, Massachusetts
Transportation in Boston
Burlington, Massachusetts
Billerica, Massachusetts
Chelmsford, Massachusetts
Transportation in Lowell, Massachusetts
Tyngsborough, Massachusetts
Transportation in Plymouth County, Massachusetts
Transportation in Norfolk County, Massachusetts
Transportation in Suffolk County, Massachusetts
Transportation in Middlesex County, Massachusetts
U.S. Route 3